"In Pictures" is a song written by Joe Doyle and Bobby Boyd, and recorded by Linda Davis for her 1994 studio album Shoot for the Moon. The song was later recorded by Alabama and released in September 1995 as the second single and title track from their album In Pictures.  The song reached #4 on the Billboard Hot Country Singles & Tracks chart in December 1995.

Content
The song tells the story of a divorced father which the song implies that the mother has full custody of his daughter (and apparently has very little, if any, visitation rights) and thus is forced to watch his daughter grow up via photographs.

Chart performance

References

1995 singles
1994 songs
Alabama (American band) songs
Song recordings produced by Emory Gordy Jr.
Linda Davis songs
RCA Records singles
Songs written by Bobby Boyd (songwriter)